The Swiss Schweiz am Sonntag was a German-language weekly newspaper, published on Sundays with the main circulation areas being the Swiss Plateau and southeastern Switzerland.

History
In the autumn of 2007, the newspaper was founded by AZ Medien under the name Sonntag. On 26 September 2010, the newspaper changed its name to Der Sonntag. On March 24, 2013, the newspaper was renamed to Schweiz am Sonntag, as it was also the Sunday edition of Die Südostschweiz. The editorial consisted of approximately thirty-five people, with Patrik Müller as the editor-in-chief.

On 26 February 2017, the last edition of Schweiz am Sonntag was published. Instead, since 4 March 2017, AZ Medien has published a fully-fledged Saturday edition of the Aargauer Zeitung titled Schweiz am Wochenende. The reasoning given for the discontinuation of the newspaper was lower advertising revenue, alongside high costs for printing and distribution.

Controversy
Editor-in-chief Patrik Müller published an article on 17 August 2014 relating to Baden mayor and then National Council member Geri Müller. According to the article, Geri Müller had been chatting with a woman for several months, sending her naked selfies, with some of the communication taking place during working hours and at the woman's place of work. Finally, there was a police operation with the woman. Therefore Patrik Müller formulated the suspicion in his article that Geri Müller abused his office as mayor.

A total of 18 active and former national and cantonal councillors from seven parties filed a complaint with the Schweizer Presserat (Swiss Press Council) against Schweiz am Sonntag. According to them, the whole political culture threatens to suffer if the Geri Müller case is furthered. The press council agreed with them; it did not see any public interest in a report on the politician's erotic chat relationship. The possibility of abuse of office could also have been eliminated with sufficient research. The Press Council found that Schweiz am Sonntag had seriously violated the privacy and intimacy of politician Geri Müller. Peter Wanner, publisher of the newspaper, defended the publication, as according to Wanner, acts of politicians in official spaces do not enjoy the protection of privacy. On September 24, 2017, Geri Müller was voted out of office as City Councillor for Baden, as well as a member of the City Council.

See also
 List of newspapers in Switzerland

References

2007 establishments in Switzerland
2017 disestablishments in Switzerland
Defunct newspapers published in Switzerland
Defunct weekly newspapers
German-language newspapers published in Switzerland
Publications established in 2007
Publications disestablished in 2017
Sunday newspapers
Weekly newspapers published in Switzerland